Carthage is a residential neighborhood located in the Mill Creek valley in Cincinnati, Ohio. It shares a border with Elmwood Place, Ohio, which, with adjacent St. Bernard, Ohio, forms a city island in the middle of Cincinnati. The population was 2,781 at the 2020 census.

History
This area was first settled in 1791 or 1792, when Capt. Jacob White, from Redstone (Brownsville), Pennsylvania settled and founded White's Station in the extreme southeastern section of Springfield Township. White's Station, a small log blockhouse, was attacked by a party of Indians on the 19th of October, 1793.

Carthage had 148 inhabitants in the 1830 United States Census.

Carthage was incorporated as a village in 1868 and then annexed into Cincinnati in 1911.

Hispanic community 
Carthage is home to a growing Hispanic community. It has several stores and restaurants such as "El Valle Verde" and others. Carthage is also the home of "Su Casa" Hispanic Ministry, which holds many events and parties.  Carthage also holds the annual Hispanic Festival.

References

Neighborhoods in Cincinnati
Populated places established in 1792
Former municipalities in Ohio